Anisota manitobensis, the Manitoba oakworm moth, is a species of royal moth in the family Saturniidae. It is found in North America, primarily Manitoba.

The MONA or Hodges number for Anisota manitobensis is 7717.

Early instar caterpillars are highly gregarious. They feed on Quercus macrocarpa.

References

Further reading

 
 

Ceratocampinae
Articles created by Qbugbot
Moths described in 1921
Lepidoptera of Canada